The 2012–13 Florida State Seminoles men's basketball team represented Florida State University in the 2012–13 NCAA Division I men's basketball season The Seminoles were led by eleventh year head coach Leonard Hamilton and played their home games at the Donald L. Tucker Center on the university's Tallahassee, Florida campus. They were members of the Atlantic Coast Conference.

The Seminoles finished the season 18–16, 9–9 in ACC play, to finish in sixth place. They lost in the quarterfinals of the ACC tournament to North Carolina. They were invited to the 2013 National Invitation Tournament where they lost in the first round to Louisiana Tech.

Previous season

The Seminoles finished the 2011–12 season 25–10, 12–4 in ACC play, and lost in the 3rd round of the NCAA tournament to Cincinnati. Florida State ended the season ranked 10th in the AP Poll and 12th in the Coaches' Poll.

Preseason

Departures

2012 recruiting class

Awards

Watchlists

Naismith Award
Michael Snaer

Honors
Michael Snaer has been honored with ACC Player of the Week recognition.

Roster

Depth chart

Team statistics
 Indicates team leader in specific category

Retrieved from Seminoles.com

Rankings

Entering the 2012–2013 season, Florida State was ranked in both the AP and Coaches' Preseason Polls. The Seminoles were ranked No. 25 in the AP Poll and No. 24 in the Coaches' Poll.

Source: ESPN.com: 2012 NCAA Basketball Rankings

Schedule
Seminole Madness was held on October 12 at the Leon County Civic Center.

|-
!colspan=12 style="background:#; color:white;"| Exhibition

|-
!colspan=12 style="background:#; color:white;"| Non-conference regular season
|-

|-

|-
!colspan=12 style="background:#; color:white;"| ACC regular season
|-

|-
!colspan=12 style="background:#; color:white;"|  ACC tournament

|-
!colspan=12 style="background:#; color:white;"|National Invitation tournament

Media
Florida State basketball is broadcast on the Florida State University Seminoles Radio Network.

References

External links
 Official Team Website
 Almanac
 Statistics

Florida State
Florida State Seminoles men's basketball seasons
Florida State
Florida State Seminoles men's basketball
Florida State Seminoles men's basketball